Agie may refer to:

 Agie River, a river in the Kobuk Valley National Park in Alaska
 Awaovieyi Agie, founding member of the Canadian Obsidian Theatre

See also 
 Aggie (disambiguation)
 Agi (disambiguation)
 Agii (disambiguation)